The Sophomore is a 1929 American pre-Code comedy film directed by Leo McCarey and starring Eddie Quillan, Sally O'Neil and Jeanette Loff. Made during the early sound era, it was shot using the RCA Photophone sound system with a separate silent version released.

Synopsis
Sophomore Joe Collins returns to college for his second year, but loses the money for his tuition in a craps game. To raise the money he takes a job working as a soda jerk. When he loses that job, he is supported financially by his co-worker Margie Callahan without his knowledge. Eventually, after a major college football game, he discovers the truth.

Cast
 Eddie Quillan as 	Joe Collins
 Sally O'Neil as 	Margie Callahan
 Stanley Smith as Tom Weck
 Jeanette Loff as 	Barbara Lange
 Russell Gleason as 	Dutch
 Sarah Padden as Mrs. Collins
 Brooks Benedict as Dan Willis
 Spec O'Donnell as 	Joe's Nephew
 Walter O'Keefe as 	Gabriel McAfee - Radio Announcer
 Jimmy Aldine as 	Student 
 Lew Ayres as 	Sophomore Fraternity Brother 
 Ray Cooke as 	Sophomore Fraternity Brother 
 Stuart Erwin as 	Radio Broadcast Technician 
 Dorothy Granger as 	Co-Ed 
 Marian Marsh as 	Co-Ed 
 Grady Sutton as 	Cupie - Freshman Fraternity Brother 
 Gretta Tuttle as 	Co-Ed 
 Dorothy Ward as 	Co-Ed

References

Bibliography
 Munden, Kenneth White. The American Film Institute Catalog of Motion Pictures Produced in the United States, Part 1. University of California Press, 1997.

External links
 

1929 films
1929 comedy films
1920s English-language films
American comedy films
Films directed by Leo McCarey
Pathé Exchange films
American black-and-white films
1920s American films